Randall W. Moller (born August 23, 1963) is a Canadian former professional ice hockey player. He was drafted in the first round, eleventh overall by the Quebec Nordiques in the 1981 National Hockey League (NHL) entry draft. The majority of his career was spent with the Quebec Nordiques. Moller also played with the New York Rangers, Buffalo Sabres and the Florida Panthers. Randy is the brother of Mike Moller. He is currently a color commentator for the Panthers.

Broadcasting career
He was featured on the cover of NHLPA Hockey '93 along with goaltender Mike Richter. Moller has been the Panthers' television color analyst since 2015, following eight seasons as the team's radio play-by-play announcer and nine years as a radio analyst before that. He is known for screaming a pop culture reference after Florida Panther goals, though not every goal, and not when the Panthers are out of the game. Examples such as references to Tracy Morgan on 30 Rock, a Christian Bale tirade, film quotes from Wedding Crashers, Jaws, and Forrest Gump are included on a YouTube clip produced by The Dan Le Batard Show with Stugotz.

The goal calls by Moller were done in conjunction with The Dan Le Batard Show, which shared the radio station that hosts the Florida Panthers radio play-by-play. The show and listeners provide Moller with numerous pop culture references, and he then chooses what he likes and uses it during games. He is also the president of the Panthers Alumni Association.

Career statistics

Regular season and playoffs

International

Awards
 WHL Second All-Star Team – 1982

References

External links

1963 births
Billings Bighorns players
Buffalo Sabres players
Florida Panthers announcers
Florida Panthers players
Sportspeople from Red Deer, Alberta
Lethbridge Broncos players
Living people
National Hockey League broadcasters
National Hockey League first-round draft picks
New York Rangers players
Quebec Nordiques draft picks
Quebec Nordiques players
Red Deer Rustlers players
Rochester Americans players
Ice hockey people from Alberta
Canadian ice hockey defencemen